Willa Lybrand Fulmer (February 3, 1884May 13, 1968) was a United States representative from South Carolina. She was born in Wagener, South Carolina, where she attended the Wagener public schools.  She graduated from Greenville (Baptist) Female College in Greenville, South Carolina, which eventually merged with Furman University.

Fulmer's husband, Hampton P. Fulmer, was a United States Representative from 1923 to 1944.  She was elected as a Democrat to the Seventy-eighth Congress to fill the vacancy caused by his death in 1944, and served from November 7, 1944, to January 3, 1945. She was not a candidate for election to the Seventy-ninth Congress. After leaving Congress, she engaged in agricultural pursuits until her retirement. She died May 13, 1968, aboard a ship on the North Atlantic Ocean en route to Europe and was buried in Memorial Park Cemetery, Orangeburg, South Carolina.

See also
 Women in the United States House of Representatives

References

1884 births
1968 deaths
Furman University alumni
Female members of the United States House of Representatives
People from Wagener, South Carolina
People who died at sea
Democratic Party members of the United States House of Representatives from South Carolina
Women in South Carolina politics
20th-century American politicians
20th-century American women politicians